This is a list of Interstate Highways in the U.S. state of California that have existed since the 1964 renumbering. It includes routes defined by the California State Legislature but never built, as well as routes entirely relinquished to local governments.

Each state highway in California is maintained by the California Department of Transportation (Caltrans) and is assigned a Route (officially State Highway Route) number in the Streets and Highways Code (Sections 300-635). Under the code, the state assigns a unique Route X to each highway and does not differentiate between state, US, or Interstate highways.

Overview
Lengths for each state route were initially measured as they were during the 1964 state highway renumbering (or during the year the route was established, if after 1964) based alignment that existed at the time, and do not necessarily reflect the current mileage. Portions of some routes have been relinquished to or are otherwise maintained by local or other governments, and may not be included in the length listed below. Several routes are broken into non-contiguous pieces, and their lengths may not reflect the overlaps that would be required to make them continuous. Some routes may also have a gap because it is either explicitly defined in the California Streets and Highways Code or due to an unconstructed portion, and the listed length may or may not reflect the gap. Additionally, if a route was renumbered, the old or new number is given in the "notes" column. Years shown are when legislative action was taken, not when real-world changes were made.

Concurrences are not explicitly codified in the Streets and Highways Code; such highway segments are listed on only one of the corresponding legislative route numbers—for example, the I-80/I-580 concurrency, known as the Eastshore Freeway, is only listed under Route 80 in the highway code while the definition of Route 580 is broken into non-contiguous segments. When a highway is broken into such segments, the total length recorded by Caltrans only reflects those non-contiguous segments, and does not include those overlaps that would be required to make the route continuous.

Since the 1990s, a number of piecemeal relinquishments have been made. These are generally reflected in the length but not the termini. Former termini are not shown if they are along the current route, meaning that the route was simply extended.

One Interstate Highway—Interstate 305—is defined only federally; the state calls it part of US 50. It was signed as part of Business Interstate 80, the only state-maintained Interstate business route in California.

Primary Interstates

Auxiliary Interstates

Business Routes

See also

Notes

References

 
Lists of roads in California